Warren County Public Schools is a school division that serves students living in Warren County, Kentucky.

History
Warren County Public Schools was established in 1908 by the Warren County Board of Education in conjunction with the Trustees of the Bowling Green Schools. In 2021, the district was considering changing some elementary school attendance boundaries even though some parents opposed this.

Logo
In May 2022, the district unveiled an updated logo, keeping with the vision established with the previous logo "Where Children Prepare for Success."

Administration

Superintendent 
The current Superintendent of Warren County Public Schools is Rob Clayton. He has served as superintendent since 2013 and was named the 2023 Kentucky Superintendent of the Year by the Kentucky Association of School Administrators. Before being appointed superintendent, he served as Principal of South Oldham Middle School in Oldham County Schools.

Board of Education Members 

 Kerry Young - Chairman
 Garry Chaffin - Vice Chairman
 Amy Duvall
 Kevin Jackson
 Lloyd Williford

Schools

Elementary Schools (K-6) 

Alvaton Elementary School
Briarwood Elementary School
Bristow Elementary School
Cumberland Trace Elementary School
Jennings Creek Elementary School
Lost River Elementary School
William H. Natcher Elementary School
North Warren Elementary School
Oakland Elementary School
Plano Elementary School
Jody Richards Elementary School
Richardsville Elementary School
Rich Pond Elementary School
Rockfield Elementary School
Warren Elementary School

Middle Schools (7-8) 

 Drakes Creek Middle School
 Henry F. Moss Middle School
 South Warren Middle School
 Warren East Middle School

High Schools (9-12) 

 Greenwood High School
 South Warren High School
 Warren Central High School 
 Warren East High School

Alternate Schools 

 Jackson Academy
 Lighthouse Academy
 Warren County Day Treatment
 Beacon Academy
 Geo International High School

References 

Education in Warren County, Kentucky
School districts in Kentucky